Terry Lewis (22 October 1937 – 21 July 1975) was an  Australian rules footballer who played with South Melbourne in the Victorian Football League (VFL).

Notes

External links 

1937 births
1975 deaths
Australian rules footballers from Victoria (Australia)
Sydney Swans players